Music Makers is an album by Helen Merrill. It was recorded in March 1986 and released by Owl Records.

Reception

The AllMusic review by Scott Yanow awarded the album four stars and said "all of the songs sound quite fresh, partly due to the unusual instrumentation and also partly because of the players' inventiveness". The Penguin Guide to Jazz contrasted the playing of Steve Lacy and Stéphane Grappelli: "The saxophonist's playing seems as private as Merrill's own path through the lyrics, whereas Grappelli offers an antidote by pouring on the Gallic charm".

Track listing
 "'Round Midnight" (Bernie Hanighen, Thelonious Monk, Cootie Williams) - 5:56
 "Sometimes I Feel Like a Motherless Child" (Traditional) - 4:28
 "A Tout Choisir" (Joël Holmès) - 2:08
 "When Lights Are Low" (Benny Carter, Spencer Williams) - 3:28
 "And Still She Is With Me" (Gordon Beck) - 4:52
 "Music Makers" (Helen Merrill, Torrie Zito) - 3:11
 "Laura" (Johnny Mercer, David Raksin) - 4:30
 "As Time Goes By" (Hermann Hupfeld) - 5:17
 "A Girl in Calico" (Arthur Schwartz) - 3:35
 "(In My) Solitude" (Eddie DeLange, Duke Ellington, Gordon Mills) - 3:39
 "Oh, Lady Be Good!" (George Gershwin, Ira Gershwin) - 3:40
 "Nuages" (Django Reinhardt) - 3:58

Source:

Personnel
Performance
Helen Merrill - vocals
Gordon Beck - piano, electric piano
Steve Lacy - soprano saxophone (tracks 1–6)
Stéphane Grappelli - violin (tracks 7–12)

Source:

Production
Bernard Amiard - art direction, cover art concept, cover design, design
Christian Orsini - cutting engineer, engineer
Jean-Marie Guérin - engineer
Laurent Peyron - engineer, mixing
Leonard Feather - liner notes
Jean-Jacques Pussiau - photography, producer
Francois LeMaire - producer
Pascal Bodin - release preparation

References

Helen Merrill albums
1986 albums